Kozhevnikovo is a rural locality (a selo) and the administrative center of Kozhevnikovsky District of Tomsk Oblast, Russia, located on the Ob River. Population:

Notable people
 Konstantin Rausch (1990) — Russian-German footballer

References

Rural localities in Tomsk Oblast